The 2007 Spokane Shock season continued the team's Cinderella story from 2006, which saw the Shock go 17-2 (including playoffs) and become the first expansion team in af2 history.  Of course, the ultimate goal in 2007 was to make it back to the ArenaCup Championship Game.

Off-season
The 2006-2007 off season saw several members of the 2006 team get signed by AFL teams. Between seasons Head Coach Fred Siegfried accepted the offensive coordinator position for the AFL's Kansas City Brigade.

Regular season

Week 1: vs. Stockton Lightning

at Spokane Veterans Memorial Arena, Spokane, Washington

In front of another sold out crowd, 10,653 fans watched the defending 2006 ArenaCup Champions take to the field on Saturday, March 31, 2007 for their season opener.  The season started off just as it did in the 2006 season; a home game against the Stockton Lightning.  The game started with a Shock touchdown on a fumble return as the Lightning fumbled the opening kickoff.  Three receivers (Antwone Savage, Chico Mackey, and Raul Vijil) had multiple catches combining for 162 yards and 18 receptions.  Shock Quarterback Andrico Hines was honored as the Offensive Player of the Game after passing for three touchdowns and 168 yards with only one interception.  On the defensive side of things, the Shock made a statement by producing three key turnovers (3 fumbles and 2 interceptions (both by Rob Keefe).  The defense also made a goal-line stand in the 3rd quarter.  The Shock stuffed the Lighting and prevented a touchdown after Stockton made four straight goal-line attempts from the 1 yard-line.  The Shock won the game 51-35.

Week 2: vs. Quad City Steamwheelers

at Spokane Veterans Memorial Arena, Spokane, Washington

Looking to go 2-0, the Shock took to the field against the Quad City Steamwheelers on April 6, 2007 in front of yet another sold out crowd of 10,560 fans.  The game started off slow for both teams due to sloppy play and numerous penalties on both teams.  Only 13 total points were scored during the first quarter.  The game was earmarked the game of the week in the af2 because in the coaches' poll, the Shock were ranked 2nd, and the Steamwheelers were ranked 3rd.  The rankings didn't lie, as both teams were neck and neck in scoring for three quarters when the Steamwheelers pulled away in the 4th by scoring 27 points, as opposed to the Shock's 18.  Statistically, the Shock played the better game, and would have won, but Quad City capitalized on the Shock's four interceptions, two of them being end zone interceptions.  Because of that, Coach Adam Shackleford benched starting quarterback Andrico Hines in the 4th quarter and put in backup quarterback Matt Gutierrez.  For only the second time in franchise history, the Shock lost a home game, with the Steamwheelers beating them 60-45.

Week 3: at Fort Wayne Fusion

at Allen County War Memorial Coliseum, Fort Wayne, Indiana

Rebounding from a dismal performance the last week, quarterback Andrico Hines threw for 5 touchdowns and 0 interceptions.  The final minute of the game saw four touchdowns scored in total.  With one second left on the clock, the Spokane Shock had an opportunity to tie the game, but Hines threw and incomplete pass off the net.  The result was a loss, and the first time in franchise history that the team lost two straight games.

Week 4: vs. Lubbock Renegades

at Spokane Veterans Memorial Arena, Spokane, Washington

Looking to rebound from an unprecedented two straight losses, the Spokane Shock put on a show.  QB Andrico Hines threw six touchdowns (17-31, 192 yards) without throwing an interception for the second consecutive week. The Renegades defense focused on WR Antwone Savage who was limited to only six receptions (his lowest total of the season) but still managed to haul in four touchdowns and 75 yards. As a result, Hines had to turn to receiver Andre Rector, who continued to improve from Week 3, The Shock's other receiver, Raul Vijil, had two touchdown receptions but left the game in the third quarter after spraining his ankle.
The Spokane defense also put on a show.  The Shock had several huge stops, which limited the Renegades to just 26 points.  The secondary made outstanding contributions.  In addition to the 5 pass breakups from Nygel Rogers and Alex Teems, the defense forced two turnovers (both interceptions by Rob Keefe, one being returned 13 yards for a touchdown) and made 26 tackles.  This contrasted the previous week, in which the Shock allowed the Fusion to score 63 points, and they had 32 missed tackles.

Week 5: @ Stockton Lightning

at Stockton Arena, Stockton, California

The Spokane Shock used a blocked field goal as time expired in regulation to avert a last-second comeback by the Stockton Lightning, and got their first road win of the season.  Spokane QB Andrico Hines completed 22-of-33 passes for 244 yards and three touchdowns.  Spokane and Stockton traded touchdowns in the first quarter and were tied at 7-7 going into the second quarter.  The second quarter proved no different for either team as the two teams were tied at 27 a piece going into half time after a 1-yard rush by Katon Bethay with no time remaining in the 2nd quarter.

During the third quarter, the Lightning took the lead for a brief time.  Stockton was ahead by a touchdown while the Shock scored a field goal, and then scored another touchdown to retake the lead by 3.  The Lightning would never retake the lead for the rest of the game.  On the final play of the game, Lightning kicker Alex Walls then lined up a 47-yard field goal attempt to tie the game which was deflected by two Spokane defenders, ending the game.

Week 6: BYE WEEK
The Spokane Shock had a bye week this week.

Week 7: vs. Bakersfield Blitz

at Spokane Veterans Memorial Arena, Spokane, Washington

The Blitz's offense made the most of their scoring opportunities converting on five of seven opportunities in the red zone, led by QB Denny Gile (18/37, 181 yards, 3 touchdowns). The Shock's offense countered with three touchdowns led by QB Andrico Hines (18/31, 168 yards, 2 touchdowns).

After the game, Hines stressed the importance of getting back to the "fundamentals" of the game.
 
The fundamentals of the game seemed to hurt both teams, as they combined for 27 penalties that accounted for 163 yards. Several calls were questioned by the sell-out Shock crowd that nullified two would-be touchdowns. Shock Head Coach Adam Shackleford would not comment on the officiating in his post-game press conference.
 
Blitz WR Rennard Reynolds led the team in receptions (7) for 71 yards with two touchdowns. The Shock's receiving core, already decimated by injuries, had to call on Rob Keefe to play on both sides of the ball and ended up leading the team in receptions (6) for 38 yards.

Week 8: @ Boise Burn

at Qwest Arena, Boise, Idaho

The defending af2 National Champions Spokane Shock scored the first 20 points of the game and never looked back as they handed the Boise Burn their first home loss of the year. 62-44 in front of 5,353 fans at Qwest Arena

Shock QB Andrico Hines (Schutt Offensive Player of the Game) started the scoring when he hit WR Antwone Savage for a 23-yard TD 7 minutes into the game giving Spokane the early 6-0 lead. 15 seconds later The momentum really shifted into the  hands of the Shock on the ensuing kick off. John Koker's kick took a wild bounce off the net and Ben Brown recovered the loose ball in the end zone (John Koker PAT) giving Spokane the early 13-0 lead. Ben Brown then did some damage on offense. Brown took a Hines hand off 16 yards up the gut untouched giving the Shock a 20-point lead they would never relinquish.

Boise finally got on the board 22 seconds later, when Bart Hendricks found Cole Clasen  for a 16-yard score bringing Boise to within 14.  Hendricks would close the gap to 8 on a 1-yard QB keeper with 26 seconds left to go in the half, but the Shock answered with a 25-yard field Goal as time expired and Spokane would lead by 11 at the Break.

In the 3rd Quarter Spokane outscored the Burn 19-8, Hines connected with Kelvin Dickens on a 6-yard TD pass and after a Lee Marks 26 yard TD, Hines found Savage on a  pair of TD's (21,11) giving the Shock a 42-20 lead after 3 quarters.

The game really took a turn for the worse, when both teams exchanged words and fists at the 11:22 mark of the 4th quarter. 5 players were ejected including the ADT Defensive layer of the Game Rob Keefe. Also thrown out of the game were Nygel Rogers of Spokane and Dustin Rykert, Chris Bruhn and Tyler Bruhn of Boise. In the 4th quarter, the Burn outscored Spokane 24-20 but fell to 4 and 3 with the 62-44 loss.

Week 9: vs. Central Valley Coyotes

at Spokane Veterans Memorial Arena, Spokane, Washington

In a game reminiscent of last season's championship run, the Shock pulled out the victory on the last play of the game with an 18-yard touchdown pass from QB Justin Rummell to WR Kelvin Dickens. Rummell's game-winning touchdown pass was set up after a beautiful 48 yard kick-off return by Antwone Savage. 
 
With only :15 second left in the fourth quarter, the Coyotes marched down the field and capitalized with a one-yard punishing touchdown run by Tonae Martin that put them up by three points, 63-60. As the Shock lined up for the ensuing kick-off, Savage headed out to the field for the return, his only return of the game after being limited by a slight hamstring strain.

Rummell was inserted into the lineup after Hines was pulled due to injury in the second quarter. Hines finished the game completing seven of eleven passes with two touchdowns and no interceptions. Rummell, who was awarded the Schutt's Offensive Player of the Game Award, finished the game completing 12 of 16 passes with 213 yards and five touchdowns, including the game-winner.
 
Dickens had another break-out game hauling in seven receptions for 153 yards with two touchdowns. Savage contributed six receptions with two touchdowns and newcomer Anthony Brown had five receptions for 68 yards.

Week 10: vs. Everett Hawks

at Spokane Veterans Memorial Arena, Spokane, Washington

The Spokane Shock defeated the Everett Hawks tonight in front of a sold-out crowd, 52-47. For the second game in a row, the victory came down to the final play of the game; but this time it was the Shock's defense that sealed the win.

With only four seconds left, Everett's QB Jason Campbell's pass attempt to WR Phillip Goodman fell incomplete with Shock defender Nygel Rogers draped all over him on the goal-line.

The defense of the Shock came through with several key stops, including newcomer Devon Parks who was selected as the ADT Defensive Player of the Game. Parks, who signed with the team on Thursday (the same day he arrived), was inserted into the starting line-up and came through with 5 total tackles (eight assists, one solo) including a four-yard sack on the first play of the game.  DB Alex Teems had the difficult assignment of covering Hawks leading receiver Josh Richey but still managed to contribute key pass break-ups (with three) and led the team in tackles.

Richey, who was selected as the Schutt's Offensive Player of the Game, was the primary source of offense for the Hawks as he led the team in receptions (seven) and touchdowns (three). Teems, however, was able to shut down Richey, who did not have a single catch in the 4th quarter.

The offense of the Shock was once again led by the lethal Hines-Savage combination. Savage, who led the team in receptions, fell one reception short of breaking Charles Frederick's single-game record of 15. He also had a personal best in receiving yards for the season with 179, which also led the team, and contributed four touchdowns.

The Hawks defense put heavy pressure on Hines all night and came up with three sacks – including 1.5 from former Shock DL Chuck Jones. Hines, however, still managed to complete 74 percent of his passes (20/27) with 233 yards and five touchdowns.

K John Koker made a touchdown saving tackle in the 4th quarter on the 10 yard line but sustained a concussion.

Week 11: @ Bakersfield Blitz

at Rabobank Arena, Bakersfield, California

The Spokane Shock reversed what had happened to them when Bakersfield played them in Spokane.  In that game, the Shock jumped out to a 21-0 lead, and lost the game.  In this game, the Blitz jumped out to a 21-0 lead, and lost the game.
WR Antwone Savage grabbed 9 passes for 90 yards and WR Kelvin Dickens added 2 touchdowns to lead the Shock offense. Savage was named the Schutt Offensive Player of the Game.

The Shock defense did a great job not letting Bakersfield QB Chad Elliott (Syracuse, '01) not get comfortable. Spokane DL Devon Parks was named ADT Defensive Player of the Week for the second week in a row after sacking Elliott twice on the night.

Week 12: @ Tri-Cities Fever

at Toyota Center, Kennewick, Washington

The Fever jumped to an early 14-0 lead over the shock with two touchdown passes from QB Brian Baker. However, Spokane would respond and closed the gap to 13-20 with a 12-yard TD pass to WR Kelvin Dickens with 0.55 seconds left in the half. However, the Fever never wavered and would ultimately shut down Spokane in the final quarter.

Going into the 4th down 26-27 the Fever turned up the heat. Schutt Offensive Player of the Game Brian threw for two TDs in the 4th which pulled the Fever ahead 39-37. Ironman of the Game Robert Garth also came up big in the final quarter by stripping the ball from the quarterback with about 10 minutes left in the game. The shock made a late comeback with WR Chico Mackey scoring on a 1-yard touchdown run with 19 seconds left in the game making the score 34-39. However, the Fever's Robert Garth recovered the onside kick attempt and sealed the win.

Week 13: vs. Boise Burn

at Spokane Veterans Memorial Arena, Spokane, Washington

The game marked the return of WR Raul Vijil who was inserted into the starting line-up after sitting out the last week against Tri-Cities due to injury. Vijil made the most of his return, breaking the Shock's single game record for TD receptions in a game with six. (The record was previously held by Antwone Savage and Charles Frederick who each had five in separate games last season.) Vijil also accounted for 122 yards with 13 total catches.

Vijil and starting QB Andrico Hines formed a special chemistry early in the season and that chemistry returned tonight. Hines turned in a commanding performance completing 71% of his passes (24/34) for 255 yards with all six of his touchdown passes thrown to Vijil.

WR Kelvin Dickens also had one of his best games of the season, accounting for 10 receptions with 125 yards to lead the team in reception yardage.

The Shock's defense was led by Defensive Player of the Game Nygel Rogers. Rogers led the team in total tackles (5.5), pass break-ups (4) and also led the team in interceptions (2 – returned for 60 yards total). Alex Teems also turned in an award-winning performance earning the Cutter's Catch of the Game by making a diving interception in the end zone. DS Rob Keefe also got into the action coming up with a 4th Quarter interception that sealed the victory for the Shock. Teems, Keefe, and Rogers each had two interceptions each. This tied the record that Keefe set last season, for most receptions in a game.

Week 14: @ Central Valley Coyotes

at Selland Arena, Fresno, California

WR Antwone Savage, who sat out the prior week with an injury, returned to action and set a new franchise record for touchdown receptions.  His eight touchdowns tied the af2 record and broke the previous team record of six that fellow receiver Raul Vijil had set the week before.  Savage also tied the team's single-game receiving record, which was set last season by Charles Frederick, with 195 receiving yards.

After the Shock struggled in the first quarter, both offensively and defensively, Savage came up with a touchdown from QB Andrico Hines on 4th down and 5 that helped to jumpstart the Shock's offense, scoring more points than they had all season (76).

Hines turned in another incredible performance after a rocky start. After missing on his first six passes, Hines quickly caught on fire breaking a new team record for touchdown passes in a game (9), breaking the record that previously belonged to QB Alex Neist.

Defensively, the Shock came up with key stops to limit Central Valley's powerful offense led. QB Clay Groefsema. Groefsema (25/41, 304 yards, 6 passing TD's, 1 rushing TD) keyed in on his favorite targets once again in Tonae Martin and Justin Barnes. Barnes led the team in touchdown receptions (2) while Martin led the team in receiving yards (112).

Week 15: BYE WEEK
The Shock had a bye week.

Week 16: vs. Tri-Cities Fever

at Spokane Veterans Memorial Arena, Spokane, Washington

This game, beyond play-off implications, was also important for Head Coach Adam Shackleford and the Shock to even their series with division rival the Tri-Cities Fever and prove that they belong at the top of the Western Division. They proved themselves in front of over 10, 600 fans, defeating the Fever 56-36. The win locks up a playoff spot for the Shock.
 
The Fever's offense, led by QB Brian Baker, sputtered a bit in the first half scoring only 14 points against a stingy Shock defense. DL Devon Parks, who won the ADT Defensive Player of the Game Award, contributed two sacks on the night. After playing in only five games for the Shock, Parks already owns the club record for sacks in a season (6) breaking Neil Purvis' record (3.5) from last season. 
 
QB Andrico Hines ran a very efficient offense throwing six touchdown passes, with only 139 yards of total passing yards. Hines (21-27, 139 yards, 6 TD's) hooked up with WR Antwone Savage for four touchdowns to add to his season total of 38 touchdown receptions. WR Chico Mackey, who tied Savage for the team lead in receptions (7), filled in for WR Raul Vijil who left the game in the first quarter after re-aggravating his ankle injury.

Week 17: @ Amarillo Dusters

at Amarillo Civic Center, Amarillo, Texas
 
 
The Shock lost two key members of their offense. QB Andrico Hines went down in the first quarter with a strained back while WR Antwone Savage went down with an injured toe. After the game, Head Coach Adam Shackleford said that Hines will be ready to return to action next week, while Savage will be a game time decision. hackleford explained.
 
The Shock defense forced Dusters' QB Steve Panella into 3 interceptions, and kept him off balance all night. Panella struggled, going 19 of 40 for 143 yards with just 1 touchdown.  The Dusters were unable to muster any running game against the Shock, totaling 0 net yards on 6 attempts as a team.  Derek Watson led the Dusters with 10 catches for 53 yards and 1 touchdown.
 
Meanwhile, quarterback Justin Rummell of the Shock took over for an injured Hines early in the first quarter, and was careful with the football for the remainder of the game. He completed 8 of 16 passes for 164 yards and 3 touchdowns, and did not turn the ball over. Chico Mackey and Katon Bethay had impressive nights rushing the football. Mackey carried the ball 4 times for 38 yards and 2 touchdowns, while Bethay had 9 carries for 29 yards and a touchdown as well. Antwone Savage led all receivers with 2 catches for 81 yards and 2 touchdowns.

The win wrapped up the American Conference's Western Division title and also assured the Shock of at least one home play-off game.

Week 18: @ Everett Hawks

at Everett Events Center, Everett, Washington

The Shock came to Everett with nothing to gain having already locked up the No. 2 seed in the American Conference playoffs, but they played like a team on a mission in dismantling the Everett Hawks 65-38.

The Shock had just four offensive plays in the 1st quarter but managed to score three offensive touchdowns.  The Hawks on the other hand had 16 plays but only scored when Aaron Dunklin took an attempted onside kick in for 6 points early in the quarter.

The Hawks were as close as 26-22 in the second quarter, but the Shock blew it open from there.  The Shock held a 32-22 lead at the half and it never got closer as the Hawks lost the game and their collective cools down the stretch.  QB Jason Campbell was ejected in the 4th quarter after the game had already been decided.  Phil Goodman came in at quarterback and was 3-4 for 37 yards.

Chico Mackey led the Shock with six total touchdowns (3 rushing, 3 receiving) and 123 total yards.

Josh Richey led the Hawks with 182 yards on 13 receptions and two touchdowns.  He finished the season with 1,958 yards, 148 receptions and 44 touchdowns.  His yardage total is the 3rd best total in league history.  His touchdown and reception totals will rank in the top five all-time as well.

Post Season

First Round: vs. Louisville Fire

at Spokane Veterans Memorial Arena, Spokane, Washington

Spokane Shock seasons
2007 in sports in Washington (state)